Chlosyne lacinia, the bordered patch or sunflower patch, is a North and South American butterfly in the family Nymphalidae.

Description

The bordered patch is an extremely variable butterfly. The upperside of the wings is mainly black with the forewing having rows of white and/or yellow-orange spots of varying sizes. There is usually one whitish spot in the forewing cell. The hindwing has many color variations. Those variations can be: almost completely black to having some red postmedian spots to having a few rows of white postmedian spots to having an all red-orange discal area to having a yellow-orange postmedian band of varying width. The underside of the wings is just as variable as the upperside. It varies from having a few rows of white and red spots to having a yellow-white hindwing median band of varying width to the underside being mostly golden yellow with large yellow-orange spots and a thick golden-yellow median band. All of these variations have a red spot near the hindwing tornus.

Similar species
Similar species in the bordered patch's range include the crimson patch (Chlosyne janais), the rosita patch (Chlosyne rosita), and the red-spotted patch (Chlosyne marina).

The crimson patch is larger, the upperside of the forewing has two spots in the cell, and the underside of the hindwing has a yellow basal patch with black spots in it.

The upperside of the rosita patch's hindwing has a basal patch which is often two toned, and the underside of the hindwing is mostly pale yellow with a thick black marginal border.

The red-spotted patch has a row of red marginal spots on the upperside, and underside of the hindwing.

Habitat

The bordered patch may be encountered in habitats such as desert hills, mesquite woodlands, pinyon woodlands, and oak woodlands. In North America, this species prefers to inhabit agricultural areas and weedy wastelands where the preferred host plant Helianthus annuus occurs.

Flight
This species is found from May to October in California, late January to mid-November in Arizona, and all year in southern Texas.

Life cycle

Males will find females by awaiting them on hilltops. Females will lay their eggs in clusters of about 100 or more on the underside of host plant leaves. The eggs are pale yellow green but later turn a reddish color. The young larvae feed together and but do not make a nest. They will become solitary when older. The larva is as variable as the adult. It ranges from mostly orange with black spines and stripes to black with a red-orange mid-dorsal stripe to almost all black. All variations have a red-orange head. The chrysalis varies from almost all white to white with black markings to nearly all black. The third instar larva hibernates and also estivates. The bordered patch has three or four broods per year.

Host plants
Here is a list of host plants used by the bordered patch:

 Common ragweed, Ambrosia artemisiifolia
 Giant ragweed, Ambrosia trifida var. texana
 Baltimora species
 Straggler daisy, Calyptocarpus vialis
 bonesets, Eupatorium spies
 Indian blanketflower, Gaillardia pulchella
 Sunflower, Helianthus annuus
 Silverleaf sunflower, Helianthus argophyllus
 Texas blueweed, Helianthus ciliaris
 Cucumberleaf sunflower, Helianthus debilis
 Maximilian sunflower, Helianthus maximiliani
 Jerusalem artichoke, Helianthus tuberosus
 Camphor weed, Heterotheca latifolia
 Showy palafox, Palafoxia sphacelata
 Santa Maria feverfew, Parthenium hysterophorus
 Crown-beard, Verbesina encelioides
 Xanthium pennsylvanicum
 Orange zexmenia, Zexmenia hispida

References

Butterflies of North America
lacinia
Nymphalidae of South America
Butterflies described in 1837
Taxa named by Carl Geyer